Roger Mengue Mi Ekomie is a Gabonese politician and agronomist. He is the current National Secretary in charge of Agriculture, Animal Husbandry, and Rural Development of the ruling Gabonese Democratic Party (Parti démocratique gabonais, PDG).

References

Gabonese Democratic Party politicians
Living people
Year of birth missing (living people)
Government ministers of Gabon
21st-century Gabonese people